Acaiatuca is a genus of longhorn beetles of the subfamily Lamiinae, containing the following species:

 Acaiatuca denudata Galileo & Martins, 2001
 Acaiatuca quadricostata (Tippmann, 1953)

References

Hemilophini
Cerambycidae genera